Hanny Kellner (born October 31, 1892, date of death unknown) was an Austrian diver who competed in the 1912 Summer Olympics. She was born in Vienna.

In 1912 she was eliminated in the first round of the 10 metre platform event. She did not finish the competition.

References

External links
profile

1892 births
Year of death missing
Austrian female divers
Olympic divers of Austria
Divers at the 1912 Summer Olympics